Milano Beach Soccer is a professional beach soccer team based in Milan, Italy.

Mundialito de Clubes 2016 squad

Coach:  Emiliano del Duca

Honours

International competitions
Mundialito de Clubes
 Group Stage: 2012
 Quarter Final: 2011

External links

Italian beach soccer teams
Sport in Milan